Robert Garrett (1875–1961) was an American athlete.

Robert Garrett may also refer to:

 Bobby Garrett (born 2000), Country singer
 Bobby Garrett (1932–1987), American football player
 Bob Garrett (TV), character on the TV series October Road
 Robert Garrett (footballer) (born 1988), Northern Irish footballer
 Robert Garrett (basketball) (born 1977), German basketball player
 Robert Garrett (British Army officer) (1794–1869)